Rosario Bank is a former atoll in the southern Caribbean Sea, located less than 20 km south of Misteriosa Bank. It is in Honduras' exclusive economic zone.

Rosario Bank is roughly rectangular in extent, being 16 kilometers long east-west, and eight kilometers wide. It has depths of 18 to 64 meters. The distance to the Honduran mainland at Punta Patuca in the south is 290 km, and to Banco Chinchorro off the Belize mainland in the west is about 330 km. The nearest dry land are the Swan Islands 112 km to the south.

References

Atolls of Honduras